Barend Klaas Kuiper (July 16, 1877 – July 21, 1961) was a history professor and  author who wrote about Dutch Calvinist church history and the Protestant Reformation.

Personal life 
Kuiper was born in Oud-Loosdrecht in the Netherlands on July 16, 1877, to Reverend Klaas Kuiper and Maaike Kuiper (née de Bruijn). When B.K. was 14, his family moved to Chicago, Illinois, USA.

Kuiper, who modified his middle name to "Klass", graduated from the University of Chicago with a B.A. degree in 1900. He took a teaching position in the literary department of the Calvin Theological Seminary soon after.

Barend Klass Kuiper died on July 21, 1961, due to complications from diabetes. His wife, Cornelia (Van Zanten), and their son, Klare V. Kuiper, survived him.

Professional life 
Kuiper was the first history professor at Calvin College (Calvin Theological Seminary), Grand Rapids Michigan, beginning in 1900, a position he held until 1928, when he was dismissed after watching a movie.

He was the editor of De Wachter from 1918 to 1922.

Kuiper wrote a number of books, a few of which are still available, including The Church In History, which has been used widely as a textbook in Christian Education. Other works in English include Martin Luther: The Early Years and With All My Heart. He also has authored books that have been published in the Dutch language.

References

External links
 

1877 births
1961 deaths
Calvin Theological Seminary faculty
Dutch emigrants to the United States
Historians of Christianity
People from Wijdemeren
University of Chicago alumni